The U.P. Hidden Coast Recreational Heritage Trail is a Pure Michigan Byway on the Upper Peninsula of the US state of Michigan that follows three different highways:
US Highway 41 (US 41) through Menominee from the Wisconsin–Michigan state line on the Interstate Bridge to M-35 on the north side of town;
M-35 from US 41 along the Green Bay and Little Bay de Noc to Gladstone ; and
US 2/US 41 from Escanaba to Mather Avenue in Gladstone.

References

Pure Michigan Byways
Lake Michigan Circle Tour
Tourist attractions in Delta County, Michigan
Tourist attractions in Menominee County, Michigan
U.S. Route 2
U.S. Route 41